Arshaly (Arşaly) is a settlement in northern-central Kazakhstan. It is the administrative center of Arshaly District in Akmola Region. Population:

References

Populated places in Akmola Region